The 1920 Handley Page O/400 crash occurred on 14 December 1920 when a Handley Page Transport Handley Page O/400 on a scheduled passenger flight from London to Paris with two crew and six passengers crashed at Golders Green in North London after take-off from Cricklewood Aerodrome. The crew of two and two passengers were killed in the first fatal accident for the airline since the service had started in December 1919. It was reported as the first recorded airliner crash in history, but a larger airliner had crashed the previous year.

Aircraft
The aircraft involved was a Handley Page O/400 registered G-EAMA, a large seven-passenger twin-engined biplane airliner. It had been built by the Birmingham Carriage Company and delivered to the Royal Air Force as a bomber during the First World War. As war surplus, it was converted into a passenger configuration in 1919 by Handley Page and used by Handley Page Transport for passenger services.

Accident
The aircraft departed from Cricklewood Aerodrome around mid-day with six passengers, mail and freight for Paris. The weather was misty and the aircraft was seen flying low and crashing into a tree, falling into a back garden of a house in Golders Green (No. 6 Basing Hill) close to the airfield. Four passengers jumped or were thrown clear before the aircraft burst into flames. Two were unhurt and the other two only slightly injured. The two crew and two remaining passengers were killed in the fire. Locals rushed to help but due to the intense heat, the rescue efforts were futile. The Hendon Fire Brigade extinguished the fire and removed the bodies; the aircraft was destroyed and the newly built house was badly damaged.

Inquest
An inquest to the four deaths was held at Hendon on 16 December 1920. One of the survivors explained the events to the inquest, although he saw the engines being tested before the flight he did not hear any problems with them but the aircraft was not able to climb above 100 feet and suddenly struck a tree. After the aircraft had crashed he immediately climbed over the debris and escaped through a window. The coroner recorded a verdict that "the deceased died from consequence of burns due to the crashing of the aeroplane to the ground after striking a tree"; the coroner also said he did not have enough evidence to determine a cause.

References
Citations

Sources

Aviation accidents and incidents in 1920
1920 disasters in the United Kingdom
Aviation accidents and incidents in London
1920 in London
Golders Green
History of the London Borough of Barnet
20th century in Middlesex
Airliner accidents and incidents in the United Kingdom